Mary Jocelyn Burgener (née Rivers; March 4, 1949) is a businesswoman and politician. She is also a former municipal and provincial level politician from Alberta, Canada. She served as a Member of the Legislative Assembly of Alberta from 1993 until 2001.

Political career
Burgener was elected to the Alberta Legislature in the 1993 Alberta general election. She ran as the Progressive Conservative candidate in the electoral district of Calgary Currie. She won the race with a comfortable margin of about 2000 votes over Liberal candidate Mairi Matheson. The race also included Alberta Political Alliance leader Mark Waters who made a strong fourth place showing. She stood for office for a second term in the 1997 Alberta general election winning a reduced plurality but still finishing with a wide margin over the field of four other candidates.

Author
In May 2014, Burgener published her first book Naked Under My Coat: Writing Under the Influence of Parkinson's, a collection of poems and short stories written during the onset and formal diagnosis of Parknson's.

References

External links
Legislative Assembly of Alberta Members Listing
Jocelyn Burgener biography

1949 births
Businesspeople from Calgary
Politicians from Calgary
Politicians from Coventry
Progressive Conservative Association of Alberta MLAs
Living people
Women MLAs in Alberta